The Capitani Romani class was a class of light cruisers acting as flotilla leaders for the  (Italian Navy). Twelve hulls were ordered in late 1939, but only four were completed, just three of these before the Italian armistice in 1943. The ships were named after prominent ancient Romans ( (lit. Roman Captains)).

Design
The Capitani Romani class were originally designed as scout cruisers for ocean operations ("ocean scout"), although some authors consider them to have been heavy destroyers. After the war the two units still in service were reclassified as flotilla leaders.

The design was fundamentally a light, almost unarmoured hull with a large power plant and cruiser style armament. The original design was modified to sustain the prime requirements of speed and firepower. As a result, the three completed warships achieved  during trials. They also carried eight  torpedo tubes.

Operational history

Only Scipione Africano  and Attilio Regolo saw combat.

Scipione Africano detected and engaged four British Elco motor torpedo boats during the night of 17 July 1943 enroute to Taranto, while passing the Messina straits at high speed off Punta Posso. She sank MTB 316 and heavily damaged MTB 313 between Reggio di Calabria and Pellaro. She laid down four minefields in the Gulf of Taranto and the Gulf of Squillace from 4 to 17 August, together with the old light cruiser .

Attilio Regolo was torpedoed by the submarine  on 7 November 1942, and remained in drydock for several months with her bow shattered.

Ships
Four of the ships were scrapped before launch. Five were captured by the Germans in September 1943, still under construction. All five were sunk in harbour, one was raised and completed. Three were completed before the Italian armistice.

Post-war French service

Attilio Regolo and Scipione Africano were transferred to France as war reparations. They were renamed Chateaurenault and Guichen respectively. The ships were extensively rebuilt for the French Navy by La Seyne dockyard with new anti-aircraft-focused armament and fire-control systems in 1951–1954. The ships were decommissioned in 1961.

General characteristics as rebuilt
Displacement
Length
Beam
Draught
Machinery - unchanged
Armament
 6 – 105 mm guns (three twin turrets of German origin)
 10 – 57 mm guns (5 twin turrets)
 12 – 550 mm torpedo tubes
Sensors: Radar DRBV 20 A, DRBV 11, DRBC 11, DRBC 30, Sonar
Crew: 353

Post-war Italian service

Giulio Germanico and Pompeo Magno served in the post war Marina Militare, being renamed San Marco (D 563) and San Giorgio (D 562) respectively and reclassified as destroyers. Both ships were extensively rebuilt in 1951–1955 and fitted with American weapons and radar. Characteristics included:

General characteristics as rebuilt
 Six  guns in twin turrets fitted in 'A', 'X' and 'Y' positions, with anti-aircraft capability
 a Menon anti-submarine mortar fitted in 'B' position
 fitting of 20  Bofors AA guns
 SPS-6 and SG-6B radar, SQS-11 sonar and the Mk37 fire control system for the 127 mm guns

San Marco was further rebuilt as a cadet training ship in 1963–1965 when she was fitted with new CODAG machinery. New  guns replaced the 40 mm and 'X' 127 mm mounting. San Marco was decommissioned in 1971, San Giorgio following in 1980.

Notes

Bibliography

External links

 Classe Capitani Romani Marina Militare website 
San Giorgio (D 562) Marina Militare website 
San Marco (D 563) Marina Militare website 
 Photos of Capitani Romani ships
 Details of Regia Marina ships captured by the Germans

Cruiser classes
 
Cruisers of the Regia Marina
World War II cruisers of Italy
Cruisers of the Italian Navy
Ships built in Italy
Ship classes of the French Navy